Alan Parnaby is a British television and film actor whose career has spanned four decades and who perhaps is best known for playing William Russell in the period drama Flambards (1979).

Parnaby's television roles include Jackanory Playhouse (1979), William Russell in Flambards (1979), Tim in the episode 'Mary's Wife' in the series BBC2 Playhouse (1980), Wilfrid Corder in Hannah (1980), Mr Flax in Pinkerton's Progress (1983), Johnnie Purvis in Juliet Bravo (1984), Mr Augustus Snodgrass in The Pickwick Papers (1985), Defence lawyer in Them and Us (1985), DC Price in The Chief (1991), Satoh in A Diplomat in Japan (1992), Paul Beaty/Peter Graley in The Bill (1994-1996), First Soldier in David (1997), Prison Governor in NCS: Manhunt (2002), Colin Draper in Heartbeat (2002), Geoff Hoon in Justifying War: Scenes from the Hutton Enquiry (2004), Mr. Boykin/Ricky Carson in Casualty (1986-2004), Nick Bell/PC Terry Sanders in Doctors (2001-2005), Businessman in Spooks (2005), Steve Shaw in Two Pints of Lager and a Packet of Crisps (2006), Mike in Jane Hall (2006), Soco in Hunter (2009), and Chris Huhne in On Expenses (2010).

Film roles include the Boatman in Dead Man's Folly (1986) and Policeman in Clockwise (1986),

Theatre appearances include Guantanamo: Honour Bound to Defend Freedom (2004),<ref>'London's Tricycle Gets Political with Guantanamo Bay' - Playbill - 24 May 2004</ref> Four Nights in Knaresborough (1999) and The Riots (2011) at the Tricycle Theatre; Factory Birds (West Yorkshire Playhouse); Scraps (Orange Tree Theatre); Ten Times Table and King Lear (Derby Playhouse); Black Blood and Gold, Love on the Dole, The Corn Is Green (Royal Exchange)(1981), Doctor Faustus (1981), Lord Arthur Savile's Crime, The Merchant of Venice (Royal Exchange); One Flew over the Cuckoo's Nest (Playhouse Theatre tour); and Frankenstein and Dracula (New Vic Theatre).

FilmographyDead Man's Folly (1986, TV Movie) - The Boatman (uncredited)Clockwise'' (1986) - Policeman at Telephone Box

References

1950s births
British male television actors
British male film actors
British male stage actors
Living people